The Casket letters were eight letters and some sonnets said to have been written by Mary, Queen of Scots, to the Earl of Bothwell, between January and April 1567. They were produced as evidence against Queen Mary by the Scottish lords who opposed her rule. In particular, the text of the letters was taken to imply that Queen Mary colluded with Bothwell in the murder of her husband, Lord Darnley. Mary's contemporary supporters, including Adam Blackwood, dismissed them as complete forgeries or letters written by the Queen's servant Mary Beaton. The authenticity of the letters, now known only by copies, continues to be debated. Some historians argue that they were forgeries concocted in order to discredit Queen Mary and ensure that Queen Elizabeth I supported the kingship of the infant James VI of Scotland, rather than his mother. The historian John Hungerford Pollen, in 1901, by comparing two genuine letters drafted by Mary, presented a subtle argument that the various surviving copies and translations of the casket letters could not be used as evidence of their original authorship by Mary.

Political background: the abdication and the letters

The Queen's husband, Lord Darnley, was killed in mysterious circumstances at the Kirk o'Field in Edinburgh on 10 February 1567, and she married the Earl of Bothwell on 15 May 1567. Bothwell was widely thought to be the main suspect for Darnley's murder. The Earl of Moray, Mary's half-brother, and the 'Confederate Lords' rebelled against Queen Mary and raised an army in Edinburgh.

Mary surrendered at the Battle of Carberry Hill on 15 June 1567, was imprisoned at Loch Leven Castle, and on 24 July 1567 abdicated. Her infant son was crowned as James VI of Scotland on 29 July 1567 and Moray was made Regent of Scotland. At this time rumours spread that Mary had abdicated because of the discovery of letters which incriminated her. At the end of July 1567, the Earl of Moray, who was in London, told Guzman de Silva, Spanish ambassador to England, that he had heard of the finding of a letter in Mary's own handwriting to Bothwell which implicated her in the murder of Lord Darnley. He had not revealed this to Queen Elizabeth. By the end of August 1567, Edmund Grindal, Bishop of London, had heard that letters in Mary's handwriting urging Bothwell to hurry up with the killing of Darnley had been found in a box of Bothwell's papers, and the Bishop sent this news to the Reformer Henry Bullinger in Geneva.

According to the document called "Hay's Book of Articles," compiled by Alexander Hay for the Confederate Lords in November 1568, which narrates events from Darnley's murder to Moray's Regency, the casket and letters were found and made known before Queen Mary agreed to abdicate, and public opinion after their discovery had brought her to that decision. Moray convened his Privy Council on 4 December 1567. They made and signed a statement in preparation for the Parliament to enact Mary's abdication, which stated the letters demonstrated Mary's involvement in the murder;
in so far as by diverse her previe letters writtin and subscrivit with hir awin hand and sent by hir to James erll Boithvile chief executor of the said horrible murthour,... it is maist certain that sche wes previe, art and part (complicit) and of the actuale devise (plot) and deid of the foir-nemmit murther of her lawful husband the King our sovereign lord's father.

Mary escaped from Lochleven and made her way to England in May 1568. Her status was uncertain, as she had been accused of crimes and misrule. Elizabeth I of England ordered an inquiry into the question of whether Queen Mary should be tried for the murder of Darnley, as accused by the Scottish Lords who had deposed Queen Mary the year before. Moray came to England and showed the "casket letters" to Queen Elizabeth's officers.

Conference at York, Westminster, and Hampton Court

Nearly a year later, in October 1568, the Earl of Moray produced the Casket letters at a conference in York, headed by Thomas Howard, 4th Duke of Norfolk. Moray again showed the casket letters at Westminster on 7 December 1568. On 8 December he showed the commissioners seven papers written in French in the "Roman hand" or italic, including a "sonnet" beginning, "O Dieux ayez de moy". Copies and translations were made of these papers, which Moray claimed showed his sister's love for Bothwell and her involvement in Darnley's murder. A marriage contract between Mary and Bothwell made at Seton Palace on 5 April 1567 was exhibited. This document may have been a contemporary forgery. The next day, the Earl of Morton submitted a signed declaration about the finding of the casket.

On 10 December Moray, the Bishop of Orkney, the Commendator of Dunfermline and Patrick Lord Lindsay signed a document swearing the letters were in Mary's handwriting, and on 12 December at Hampton Court, Moray's secretary John Wood showed this statement to the Lord Keeper, the Duke of Norfolk, the Earl of Bedford, the Earl of Leicester the, Lord Admiral, William Cecil, Ralph Sadler, and Walter Mildmay.

The letters, sonnets, divorce and marriage contract were examined at Hampton Court on 14 December 1568, and the handwriting compared with Mary's letters to Queen Elizabeth. The evidence produced by the Scottish Earls, who were now sworn to secrecy by the English Privy council, was perhaps bewildering;
the whole writings lying altogether upoun the counsel table, the same were showed one after another by hap [chance], as the same did ly on the table, than with any choyse made, as by the natures thereof, if time had so served might have been.

For overriding political reasons, Queen Elizabeth neither wished to accuse Queen Mary of murder nor acquit her of the same, so the conference was intended as a political show. Queen Mary was refused the right to be present, though her accusers, including Moray, were permitted to be present.

The outcome was that the Casket letters were accepted by the English commissioners as genuine after a study of the handwriting, and of the information contained therein. However, Queen Mary's commissioners were refused access to the letters to review or to study them. Yet, as Queen Elizabeth had wished, the inquiry reached the conclusion that nothing was proven. The outcome of the enquiry was to prolong doubts about Mary's character that Elizabeth used to prevent the Queens meeting.

Accusations of collusion at York

The meeting at York was established as a conference to negotiate an Anglo-Scottish treaty. John Lesley, Mary's secretary, heard from one of her accusers, William Maitland of Lethington, that Elizabeth's purpose was "not to end her cause at this time, but to hold the same in suspense". Maitland had heard this from the presiding officer at York, the Duke of Norfolk, while they were out riding together to Cawood on 16 October 1568. The contemporary historian, George Buchanan, who was present at York amongst the Scottish commissioners, described Norfolk and Lethington's ride, and their agreement not to reach a decisive conclusion.

This conversation came to light, having been found in Lesley's correspondence, and was cited in the charges of treason against Norfolk in January 1571. He was also charged with planning to marry the Scottish Queen, and asking Moray to suppress evidence against her at York.

In November 1571, Lesley testified that he had spoken with Norfolk in a gallery at York, after conferring with Lethington, and Norfolk was convinced that the publication of the letters would dishonour Mary forever. When Norfolk was questioned about the conversations at York, he said that Lethington had told him he was working for Mary. Lethington, said Norfolk, began to make him think Mary was innocent and planted the idea that he should marry her. Nevertheless, Norfolk was executed for treason in 1572.

Lesley, who was a prisoner in the Tower of London, said that Lethington had sent copies of the casket letters to Mary (who was at Bolton Castle), but Lethington's messenger, Robert Melville, denied it. Lesley also alleged there had been a plot to murder Moray on his return as he passed through North Allerton, but because Norfolk had persuaded Moray to be more favourable, the assassination was called off.

After the York-Westminster conference, on 22 January 1569, Queen Elizabeth wrote to the Earl and Countess of Mar, who were the keepers of James VI at Stirling Castle, to counter rumours that Moray had made speeches and secret treaties in England to ensure that he would become King of Scotland to the prejudice of the young King.

Fate of the letters and casket

The charges against Queen Mary, known as Hay's Articles, were drawn up in November 1568; they state that the Earl of Bothwell, while planning his escape from Scotland, sent his servant, George Dalgleish, to fetch the letters from Edinburgh Castle, so that the "ground of the cause should never come to light". However, after recovering the letters, Dalgleish was captured by Mary's enemies, among them James Douglas, 4th Earl of Morton.

Morton testified in December 1568 that on 20 June 1567, Dalgleish offered, under the threat of torture, to take his captors to a house in Potterrow, Edinburgh. Under a bed, they found a silver box engraved with an "F" (perhaps for Francis II of France), containing the Casket letters and a number of other documents, including the Mary-Bothwell marriage certificate. Morton passed the casket and letters into the keeping of Regent Moray on 6 September 1568. Morton declared he had not altered the contents and Moray promised to kept them intact and available to Morton and the Confederate Lords in order that they could explain their actions in future; "quhen-so-evir thai sal haif to do thair-with, for manifesting of the ground and equitie of their procedingis."

The letters seem to have been retained by the Douglas family after the sudden arrest and execution of Regent Morton in 1581. There were hints that George Douglas, brother of William Douglas of Lochleven, had merchandise of letters "worth the sight" in 1582, but this may refer to his attempts to negotiate for Queen Mary's return to Scotland at this time, called the "Association".

In November 1582, the English diplomat Robert Bowes heard from James Douglas, Prior of Pluscarden, that both the coffer and the "originals of the letters betwixt the Scottish Queen and the earl of Bothwell" had been delivered to the Earl of Gowrie, who was leading the government of Scotland at that time. Bowes had been trying to find the whereabouts of the originals for Francis Walsingham.

Bowes asked Gowrie if he would send them to Elizabeth, saying that he had made previous arrangements for this, and established that Gowrie got them from Sanders Jordan. Jordan was known as one of Regent Morton's confidential servants and had been forced to testify at Morton's trial. Gowrie explained that the letters were still relevant to those who deposed the Queen. Bowes argued that recent events and establishments were confirmed by acts of parliament and public instruments and the letters were not now significant. Gowrie would not give him the letters.

Bowes asked Gowrie again later in November, and wrote to Walsingham saying he had told Gowrie that Queen Mary was now claiming they were forgeries, and was hoping to obtain them herself to deface and destroy them (perhaps to further the "Association".) Bowes argued that Mary had the means to steal them from Scotland and they would be safer in England. Gowrie said he would have to tell the King about the request and Bowes preferred not. In their next interview, Gowrie told Bowes that James VI already knew where the letters were.

The originals of the letters were probably destroyed in 1584 by James VI. Only copies exist; one is in French, and the others are translations from the French into Scots and English. The nature of these documents – authentic, forged, or only partly forged – has been the subject of much discussion for more than four hundred years.

An ornate silver casket, purportedly Queen Mary's, was acquired by Mary Gordon, wife to the 1st Marquis of Douglas. Following her death, it was sold to a goldsmith, but was later reacquired by her daughter-in law, Anne Hamilton, 3rd Duchess of Hamilton. The casket originally had the Queen's arms engraved upon it, but was replaced successively by the arms of the Marchioness, then the Duchess. The casket was formerly on display at Lennoxlove House in East Lothian (known previously as Lethington House), Maitland's family home. In 2022 the casket was bought, for £1.8m, by National Museums Scotland (with funding from a range of donors including the Scottish Government, the National Heritage Memorial Fund, and Art Fund) and will be displayed at the National Museum of Scotland in Edinburgh.

The copy letters
Four translated copies were preserved by the descendants of William Cecil. The copies do not reproduce signatures or dates, and they contain endorsements made by the copyist that indicate how the letters were to be used against Queen Mary. Versions of some of the letters and sonnets were printed in George Buchanan's polemic Detectio Mariæ Reginæ and Dectectioun, and reprinted by James Anderson in 1727. Walter Goodall, in 1754, printed parallel English, French, and Latin versions without the clerk's endorsements. The 18th-century historian William Robertson pointed out that the Scottish edition of Buchanan's Detectioun appears to preserve the original French opening lines of the letters introducing their translations, while the complete French texts seem to be merely translations from printed Latin or English copies.

Four other copy letters and other copy documents were preserved in the English state papers and the Cotton Collection.  These were printed in the Calendar of State Papers, Scotland, Volume 2.

The French sonnets, said to have been found in the casket, were printed in Anderson's Collections, Volume 2, with Scottish translations. Walter Goodall reprinted the twelve poems in Examination, Volume 2. The sonnets can be evaluated as French literature.

Notes

References
Calendar of the Manuscripts of the Marquis of Salisbury at Hatfield House. Volume 1. 1883. London: Byre and Spottiswoode.
Anderson, James (1727). Collections Relating to the History Of Mary Queen of Scotland. Volume 2. Edinburgh.
Anderson, James (1727). Collections Relating to the History Of Mary Queen of Scotland. Volume 4. Issue 2. Edinburgh.
Adam Blackwood, A Translation of Adam Blackwood's History of Mary Queen of Scots: Martyre de la Royne d'Escosse, 1587, Maitland Club (1834), contemporary arguments against the letters, pp. 82–88.
Bain, Joseph (1900). Calendar of State Papers, Scotland . Volume 2.
Boyd, William K. (1907). Calendar of State Papers, Scotland . Volume 5.
Boyd, William K. (1910). Calendar of State Papers, Scotland . Volume 6.
Goodall, Walter (1754). An Examination of the Letters, Said to be Written by Mary, Queen of Scots, to James, Earl of Bothwell, Volume 1 Edinburgh: T. and W. Ruddimans.
Goodall, Walter (1754). An Examination of the Letters, Said to be Written by Mary, Queen of Scots, to James, Earl of Bothwell, Volume 2 Edinburgh: T. and W. Ruddimans.
Haynes, Samuel (1740). A Collection of State Papers, Volume 1 London: William Bowyer.
Haynes, Samuel; Murdin, William (1759). A Collection of State Papers. Volume 2. Part 1. London: William Bowyer.
Henderson, Thomas Finlayson (1890). The Casket Letters and Mary Queen of Scots. Edinburgh.
Stevenson, Joseph (1842). Correspondence of Robert Bowes, of Aske, Esquire. London: J. B. Nichols and Son.

Further reading

Buchanan, George (1571). Ane detectioun of the duinges of Marie Quene of Scottes. London: John Day. (Available at Early English Books Online, log-in required)
Hosack, John (1870). Mary Queen of Scots and her Accusers. Volume 1. Blackwood.
Lang, Andrew (1901). The Mystery of Mary Stuart. London: Longmans, Green, and Co.
Robertson, William (1794). "A critical dissertation concerning the murder of King Henry...". The history of Scotland during the reigns of Queen Mary and of King James VI. Volume 2. 14th edition. pp. 315–384.
Strickland, Agnes (1843). Letters of Mary, Queen of Scots. Volume 3. London: Henry Colburn. pp. 278–285.
Thomson, George Malcolm (1967). The Crime of Mary Stuart. Hutchinson.
Warnicke, Retha M. (2006). Mary Queen of Scots. Taylor & Francis. .
Whitaker, John (1790). Mary Queen of Scots Vindicated. Volume 2. London: J. Murray.

Copies of the Casket letters
Letters in Scottish, Latin and French, and sonnets in French and English, in Goodall's An Examination of the Letters, Volume 2.
Laing, Malcolm (1819), History of Scotland with a Preliminary Dissertation on the Participation of Mary, Queen of Scots, in the Murder of Darnley, vol. 2, the letters and many other documents. 
Letters and sonnets (some French, some English) in Collections Relating to the History Of Mary Queen of Scotland, Volume 2.
Four letters, with clerk's endorsements, in Calendar of the Manuscripts of the Marquis of Salisbury at Hatfield House, Volume 1.
Extracts from the letters in Letters of Mary, Queen of Scots, Volume 3.
Abstracts of the letters in A Collection of State Papers, Volume 1.

Mary, Queen of Scots
Letters (message)
1567 works
Evidence law
Forgery controversies
16th century in law
16th century in Scotland
Scots law
Cotton Library
16th century in international relations
16th-century documents